Mark Proctor may refer to:
 Mark Proctor (racing driver) (born 1968), former British racing driver
 Mark Proctor (footballer) (born 1961), former English footballer and former manager of Scottish football club Livingston
 Mark Proctor (shot putter) (born 1963), British Olympic shot-putter
 Mark Proctor (canoeist) (born 1993), British slalom canoeist

See also 
 Proctor (surname)